A Hereford Beefstouw is a Danish steakhouse restaurant chain. It was founded in 1971, when the company opened its first restaurant in Herning, Denmark. Since then it has expanded to 12 restaurants in Denmark, along with restaurants in Adelaide, Australia; Nuuk, Greenland; and Göteborg, Sweden.

References

External links

 

Steakhouses
Restaurant chains in Denmark
Restaurants in Greenland
Restaurants established in 1971